"Get Busy" is a dancehall song by Jamaican reggae toaster Sean Paul, from his album Dutty Rock. The song was one of the many hits from the jumpy handclap riddim known as the Diwali Riddim, produced by then-newcomer Steven Marsden, and was the only song that never made the "Diwali" rhythm album on Greensleeves Records as it was more than likely a late entry.

Paul described it as "mainly a party song. It's not all about smoking weed". "Get Busy" topped the US Billboard Hot 100 for three weeks in May 2003 and also reached number one in Italy and the Netherlands, becoming a top-10 hit in an additional 11 countries. It was performed live on Saturday Night Live in May 2003.

Composition
"Get Busy" is written in the key of F minor in common time with a tempo of 100 beats per minute.  The song follows a chord progression of Fm−A–G–G.

Remix
The official remix, "Get Busy (Clap Your Hands Now Remix)", features rapper Fatman Scoop and the Crooklyn Clan, the remix uses the instrumental of Sean Paul's previous single, "Gimme the Light", on the near end of the song.

Music video
The video for "Get Busy" (directed by Little X) was shot in Woodbridge, Ontario, and released in February 2003. The video was also nominated for two MTV Video Music Awards for Best Dance Video and Best New Artist in 2003. The video shows people dancing to the song at a basement house party, with some partygoers banging on duct pipes until the homeowner comes down to warn them to stop the banging. At the end of the video Paul's brother Jason introduces a song, noting it as a brand new single, and Paul then sings part of "Like Glue". Shortly into the second song, renewed banging on the pipes leads the homeowner to come back down to the basement and declare the party over. Kardinal Offishall makes a cameo appearance in the video.

Track listings

US 12-inch single
A1. "Get Busy" (album version) – 3:32
A2. "Get Busy" (Diwali Riddim instrumental) – 3:20
B1. "I'm Still in Love with You" (album version) – 4:32
B2. "I'm Still in Love with You" (instrumental) – 4:16

UK CD single
 "Get Busy" (album version) – 3:31
 "Get Busy" (instrumental) – 3:20
 "Get Busy" (a cappella) – 3:43
 "Get Busy" (video) – 4:27

UK 12-inch single
A1. "Get Busy" (album version) – 3:31
B1. "Get Busy" (instrumental) – 3:20
B2. "Get Busy" (a cappella) – 3:43

European CD single
 "Get Busy" – 3:32
 "Get Busy" (Diwali Riddim instrumental) – 3:20

German 12-inch single
A1. "Get Busy" (album version) – 3:31
A2. "Get Busy" (Diwali Riddim instrumental) – 3:20
A3. "Gimme the Light" (2Step Moabit Relick remix) – 3:53
A4. "Gimme the Light" (2Step Moabit Relick instrumental) – 3:53
B1. "Like Glue" (album version) – 3:53
B2. "Like Glue" (instrumental) – 4:01

Australian CD single
 "Get Busy" (album version)
 "Get Busy" (Diwali Riddim instrumental)
 "Gimme the Light" (2Step Moabit Relick remix)
 "Gimme the Light" (Nappy Doggout remix)

Personnel
 Written by Steven Marsden and Sean Paul Henriques
 Mastered by Paul Shields
 Executive producers: Christopher Chin, Jeremy Harding, Murray Elias, and Sean Paul Henriques
 Produced by Steven "Lenky" Marsden
 Photography by William Richards
 Artwork by Floodzone Design

Charts

Weekly charts

Year-end charts

Decade-end charts

Certifications

Release history

In popular culture

The song was used in the DANCE! Online online game, and in the game Dance Dance Revolution Extreme 2.  The song's remix was played in the club scene of the 2003 film Grind. The song also briefly appeared in the season two episode of The Wire, Hot Shots. The song was used in DJ Hero 2. The song was featured in a scene from the 2004 film Chasing Liberty. An instrumental version of the song appeared on season 2 of The Office. The song was also played in a dance scene in the film Baby Mama. The song also featured in a scene in the season two episode of Bad Education.

It was used in the first trailer for the 2015 DreamWorks film Home.

See also
 List of Billboard Hot 100 number-one singles of 2003

References

External links
 

2003 singles
Billboard Hot 100 number-one singles
Dutch Top 40 number-one singles
Number-one singles in Italy
Sean Paul songs
Music videos directed by Director X
Songs written by Sean Paul
Songs written by Steven "Lenky" Marsden
Song recordings produced by Steven "Lenky" Marsden
Atlantic Records singles